Asokwa is one of the constituencies represented in the Parliament of Ghana. It elects one Member of Parliament (MP) by the first past the post system of election. Asokwa is located in the Kumasi Metropolitan District of the Ashanti Region of Ghana.

Boundaries
The seat is located within the Kumasi Metropolitan District of the Ashanti Region of Ghana.

History 
The constituency was first created in 2004 by the Electoral Commission of Ghana along with 29 other new ones, increasing the number of constituencies from 200 to 230.

Members of Parliament

Elections

See also
List of Ghana Parliament constituencies

References 

Parliamentary constituencies in the Ashanti Region